Eye of God usually refers to the Helix Nebula, also known as NGC 7293.

Eye of God may also refer to:

 Eye of God (film), a 1997 film by Tim Blake Nelson based on his 1993 play
 The Eye of God (film), a lost 1916 silent film mystery
 The Eye of God, a 2013 novel by James Rollins
 The Eye of God (Big Bear), sacred tribal landmark in Big Bear City, California
 Eye of Providence, a common religious symbol
 Ojo de Dios, or God's eye, a yarn weaving and spiritual object